The Dêrgê Barkang (pronunciation "Dehr-gheh", alternative names Derge Parkhang, Dege Parkhang, Derge Sutra Printing Temple, Dege Yinjing Yuan, Derge Barkhang, Dege Barkhang, Barkhang, Parkhang, Bakong Scripture Printing Press and Monastery) is the  (printing house) associated to the Goinqên Monastery. It is one of the foremost cultural treasures of Tibet. Derge is a county seat in a high valley in Kham, an eastern district of traditional Tibet which is now part of China's Sichuan Province. The Derge Parkhang is a living institution devoted to the printing and preservation of Tibetan literature, a printing temple that holds the greatest number of Tibetan woodblocks in the world. 
	
The Derge Sutra Printing Temple (Parkhang in Tibetan) is one of the most important cultural, social, religious and historical institutions in Tibet; China has named it a National Protected Heritage Site. Founded in 1729 by Denba Tsering, the fortieth King of Derge (1678–1739) with the spiritual and literature assistance of the 8th Tai Situ Panchen Chokyi Jungne, the Derge Parkhang is an active center for publication of Tibetan Buddhist sutra, commentaries, and thangka as well as works of history, technology, biography, medicine and literature. Books are still being made in the same way as they have been for almost three hundred years: handprinted from hand-carved wooden blocks. Cinnabar is used to colour the text red, in which workers can print eight to fifteen pages manually a minute, 2500 in a day, from wooden blocks that have already been engraved with text. Thirty printers are in working condition where printers work in pairs, one puts ink on wooden press, later cleaned in a trough, while the other rolls a piece of paper using a roller which is imprinted red with sayings of Buddha.

History 
The history of the Derge Parkhang is closely bound to the history of the Kingdom of Derge. The Derge royal dynasty traces its origins to a mythical eighth-century ancestor. It rose to found and rule an influential independent Tibetan kingdom in the Kham area of Eastern Tibet, controlling a large area straddling the Drichu River (called the Jinsha River in Chinese, and forming the upper reaches of the Yangtse River) on what is now the border between the Tibetan Autonomous Region and Sichuan. The Kings of Derge were astute politicians who maintained political power through generous patronage of religious institutions: their unusual pattern of patronage for all five schools of Buddhism meant strong support for monasteries, learning and art in the area under their political control. They were also able stay on good terms with both of their powerful neighbors, the governments of Lhasa and Beijing. A gradual weakening of the family through the nineteenth century followed by a succession struggle in the early twentieth century brought about the effective end of their political control, but they remained in nominal power until the annexation of Tibet by the Chinese Communists in 1950.

The survival of the Derge Parkhang during the "Three Crises", its close escape from destruction during the campaigns of Gonpo Namgyal in the mid-nineteenth century, survival through the succession struggles in the early twentieth century, and finally its preservation through the period of religious and cultural suppression under the Communist Party of China are credited to sources both natural and supernatural. The Parkhang returned to production in the early 1980s after a hiatus of almost twenty-five years, and today produces and distributes sutra and other books throughout Tibet, China and internationally (including the collection of the New York Public Library) as well as printed thangkas and mandala to local people, pilgrims and, increasingly, to tourists. As the present Director, Tsewang Jirme Rinpoche says, "This is not a museum of antiques, it is a living institution."  The traditional printing practices of the Derge Parkhang and two other organizations were enshrined by UNESCO as representative of humanity’s intangible cultural heritage under the heading, “Chinese Engraving and Printing Techniques.” Derge has attracted western notice (e.g. New York Times, March 19, 2000: "Storehouse of Tibetan Culture,") and welcomes tourists. Road improvements and the construction of an airport in neighboring Kandze County have made travel to Derge from Chengdu much easier than it was formerly.

The Derge Parkhang today faces a set of challenges that arise from the social, economic and political developments that arise from Kham's opening to development and tourism in the late nineties. Current leadership at the Parkhang has worked to clarify the institution's bureaucratic status, open new sources of funding and support, and to gain control of its media representation. All of these programs demand money, and both governmental support and donations steered by the government have been developed. Nevertheless, the institution remains in competition with hundreds of other cultural preservation projects in China and with numerous other religious institutions in Kham and Tibet.  The Parkhang building and especially murals painted inside its two chanting halls are in need of expert conservation, lest they be lost to water infiltration. The leadership at the Parkhang needs to find a way to transform immense cultural capital into the means to support the institution.

References 

Dowdey, Patrick, Clifton Meador, Padma 'tsho, Pearl of the Snowlands: Buddhist Prints from the Derge Parkhang, Middletown, CT: Mansfield Freeman Center for East Asian Studies, 2008.

External links 
 http://www.degeparkhang.org/index-en.htm  The official site of the Derge Parkhang (English)

Buddhist monasteries in Sichuan
Kham
Major National Historical and Cultural Sites in Sichuan
Tibetan Buddhist buildings in the Garzê Tibetan Autonomous Prefecture